St Thomas Episcopal Church, at 168 Boston Post Road in Mamaroneck, New York, is a church in the Episcopal Diocese of New York. St. Thomas' Episcopal Church Complex was added to the National Register of Historic Places in 2003.

References

External links
 St. Thomas Church official website
 Episcopal Diocese of New York website

Historic district contributing properties in New York (state)
National Register of Historic Places in Westchester County, New York
Churches on the National Register of Historic Places in New York (state)